Ida Stephens Owens (September 13, 1939 – February 24, 2020) was an American scientist known for her work with drug-detoxifying enzymes. She received her Ph.D from Duke University in 1967, making her one of the first two African Americans to receive a doctorate from the school. She spent her career at the National Institutes of Health (NIH), where she worked from 1968 to 2017 and pioneered the study of the genetics of human diseases and drug metabolism.

Early life
Ida Virginia Stephens Owens grew up on a farm in the small town of Whiteville, North Carolina. Her mother died when she was six years old.

Education
Owens' early education was in segregated public schools. Owens then attended North Carolina College, now North Carolina Central University, graduating in 1961 summa cum laude in Biology (B.S.) and Mathematics (minor). After graduating, she was employed as a laboratory assistant at a National Science Foundation Summer Institute for High School Teachers at North Carolina College, and she spent a summer in the lab of Daniel C. Tosteson in the Department of Physiology at Duke University. Then, in 1962, she began her Ph.D. studies of biochemistry and physiology in the laboratory Jacob J. Blum at Duke shortly after the university racially integrated its graduate and professional schools. When she graduated in 1967, she became one of two first African Americans, the first woman, to receive a Ph.D. from Duke University and the first woman to receive any degree in physiology from Duke.

Scientific career
After graduating, Owens held a postdoctoral position at the NIH, first at the then-called National Institute of Arthritis, Metabolic, and Digestive Diseases in the Laboratory of Biochemistry and Metabolism and then in the National Institute of Child Health and Human Development (NICHD) in the Section on Developmental Pharmacology in the Laboratory of Biomedical Sciences. During this time, she focused on how drugs are chemically processed in the body. In 1975, Owens began to lead her own independent research group at NIH NICHD within the Section on Drug Biotransformation, which later became the Section on Genetic Disorders of Drug Metabolism. She was the first African American investigator at NIH. Starting in 1988, Owens has directed NICHD's Section on Genetic Disorders of Drug Metabolism in the Program on Developmental Endocrinology and Genetics.

Scientific advancements
Owens' postdoctoral work sparked her specific interest in a critical group of enzymes, called UDP-glucuronosyltransferases (abbreviated UGTs), which allow the body to detoxify harmful drugs, chemicals, and other toxins. By designing methods to research the genes that code for specific UGT enzymes, she identified a complex of 13 genes known as UGT1A. Her lab showed that one of these genes, UGT1A1, processes the protein bilirubin, which is a breakdown product of hemoglobin.

Owens' research group has subsequently made multiple advancements regarding UGT enzyme biology. Her laboratory was the first to identify a genetic defect in the gene UGT1A1 that leads to Crigler–Najjar syndrome. Crigler–Najjar syndrome is a disorder that disrupts normal modification and excretion of bilirubin, leading to jaundice. Owens' research group also identified that UGT enzymes must be activated before they can detoxify foreign chemicals and that in some cases suppressing these enzymes could enhance the effects of therapeutic drugs. Owens' laboratory found that activity of UGT enzymes can be lessened by kinase inhibitors and that protein kinase C and tyrosine kinase enzymes can alter the enzyme specificity, likely contributing to their ability to detoxify a wide range of foreign chemicals.

Honors
Owens received the 1992 NIH Director's Award and, in 2013, the Duke University Graduate School's first Distinguished Alumni Award. In addition, in 2009, the American Asthma Foundation recognized Owens for being among the top 5% of cited authors in  pharmacology journals.

References

External links
The Education of Ida Owens

1939 births
2020 deaths
African-American women scientists
American women biochemists
American physiologists
Women physiologists
Duke University alumni
National Institutes of Health people
North Carolina Central University alumni
Scientists from North Carolina
20th-century American women scientists
21st-century American women scientists
20th-century American biologists
21st-century American biologists
20th-century African-American women
20th-century African-American scientists
21st-century African-American women
21st-century African-American scientists